is a JR West railway station located in the Hōhoku area of Shimonoseki, Yamaguchi Prefecture, Japan.

Station layout
The station consists of an island platform serving two tracks, enabling passengers to change trains. Though managed by the Nagato Railroad Bureau, there are no station staff members nor an automated ticket facility. The platform is halfway up a mountainside cliff, which is accessible via a stairway in a tunnel from the station building. There was a waiting room on the platform, though it was destroyed in a fire in 2000.

The construction of the San'in Main Line was the final link in connecting the trainlines in the area during the Taishō period. At the time, the plan was to have the entire line along the Sea of Japan's coastline, but in line with the wishes of the region's residents as well as to keep the project in budget, Takibe Station and Kottoi Station were located inland. Owing to this layout, the tracks leading to Nagato-Futami Station include curves of nearly 90 degrees.

History
 16 August 1925 - The extension of the Japanese National Rail Kogushi Line, as it was then known, from Kogushi Station to Takibe Station is completed. Nagato-Futama Station begins servicing customer as well as freight trains.
 24 February 1933 - The Kogushi Line is incorporated into the San'in Main Line.
 1 August 1961 - Freight train service cancelled.
 1 April 1987 - Under the privatisation of Japan's railways, Takibe Station becomes part of the West Japan Railway Company.
 7 August 2010 - A fire burns down the platform waiting room.

Platforms

※The platforms are not numbered at this station.

Lines
The following lines pass through or terminate at Nagato-Awano Station:
West Japan Railway Company
San'in Main Line

Local area
There are a few small shops around the station. Between Nagato-Futami Station and Kogushi Station it is possible to have a clear view of the Sea of Japan along the coastline.
 Futami Post Office
 Futami Fishing Harbour
 Futami Elementary School
 Meoto Iwa
 Tokiwaya (makers of Futami Manjū)
 Kōrin Temple
 Japan National Route 191

Bus line 
Blue Line Bus Service

User statistics
Below are the average number of people who alight at Nagato-Futami Station per day.
 1999 - 117
 2000 - 114
 2001 - 78
 2002 - 68
 2003 - 77
 2004 - 69
 2005 - 72
 2006 - 72
 2007 - 71
 2008 - 63
 2009 - 56
 2010 - 51

References

External links
 JR West station information 

Railway stations in Japan opened in 1925
Railway stations in Yamaguchi Prefecture
Sanin Main Line
Stations of West Japan Railway Company